β-Sesquiphellandrene synthase (EC 4.2.3.123, Tps1, Os08g07100 (gene)) is an enzyme with systematic name (2E,6E)-farnesyl-diphosphate diphosphate-lyase (cyclizing, β-sesquiphellandrene-forming). This enzyme catalyses the following chemical reaction

 (2E,6E)-farnesyl diphosphate  β-sesquiphellandrene + diphosphate

References

External links 
 

EC 4.2.3